Chris Lozano (born September 14, 1982) is an American professional mixed martial arts (MMA) fighter. A professional since 2008, he has fought for Bellator, and was a competitor on Fight Master: Bellator MMA.

Background
Lozano began wrestling when he was in the fifth grade. Aside from wrestling, he holds a red belt in taekwondo, which he earned when he was only 17. He also has a blue belt in Brazilian Jiu-Jitsu. He has a small boxing background, owning a 0-1 pro boxing record.

Mixed martial arts career

North American Allied Fight Series
Lozano began his mixed martial arts career fighting in NAAFS. He is undefeated under the organization with 5 knockouts. After suffering the first loss of his career to Lyman Good at Bellator 35, he bounced back with a first-round KO victory over Gerric Hayes at NAAFS: Caged Vengeance 9.

Bellator Fighting Championships
In his Bellator debut, Lozano fought UFC veteran Yoshiyuki Yoshida at Bellator 31 and defeated him by TKO (corner stoppage) to give him a spot in the Bellator Season Four Welterweight Tournament. He fought former Bellator Welterweight Champion Lyman Good in the first round of the Bellator Season Four Welterweight Tournament. He lost the fight via unanimous decision.

in 2011, Lozano entered into the Bellator Season Five Welterweight Tournament.  He fought Brent Weedman in the opening round held at Bellator 49 and won the fight via unanimous decision. In the semifinal round he lost via KO to Douglas Lima, the eventual winner of the tournament.

In 2012, Lozano was featured in the Bellator Season Six Welterweight Tournament.  He faced Karl Amoussou in the opening round of the tournament at Bellator 63 and lost via submission in the first round. Lozano was released from his contract after suffering back-to-back losses in Bellator.

Independent promotions
Lozano made his post Bellator debut on June 2, 2012 for North American Allied Fight Series in his hometown of Cleveland, Ohio. Lozano fought James Warfield, an experienced journeyman, in the co-main event of Fight Night in the Flats 8. Lozano won the fight after Warfield could not answer for the second round.

Fight Master: Bellator MMA
On May 6, 2013, it was announced that Lozano would be featured as a participant on Bellator Fighting Championships reality TV show Fight Master: Bellator MMA.

In his preliminary fight to get on the show, Lozano defeated Josh Quayhagen by unanimous decision.  During the team selection, Lozano chose Frank Shamrock to be his coach.  In his second fight, he defeated Bryan Travers by split decision in a sudden victory round.  In the quarterfinals, he faced Mike Bronzoulis and lost via unanimous decision.

Mixed martial arts record

|Loss
|align=center|10–5
|Vincius De Jesus
|TKO (knees)
|CES 58: De Jesus vs. Lozano
|
|align=center|3
|align=center|3:22
|Hartford, Connecticut, United States
|For the CES MMA Welterweight Championship.
|-
|Loss
|align=center|10–4
|Eddie Gordon
|Decision (split)
|Cage Fury Fighting Championships 60
|
|align=center|3
|align=center|5:00
|Atlantic City, New Jersey, United States
|Middleweight bout.
|-
|Win
|align=center|10–3
|James Warfield
|TKO (retirement)
|NAAFS: Fight Night in the Flats 8
|
|align=center|1
|align=center|5:00
|Cleveland, Ohio, United States
|
|-
|Loss
|align=center|9–3
|Karl Amoussou
|Submission (rear-naked choke)
|Bellator 63
|
|align=center|1
|align=center|2:05
|Uncasville, Connecticut, United States
|
|-
|Loss
|align=center|9–2
|Douglas Lima
|KO (punch)
|Bellator 53
|
|align=center|2
|align=center|3:14
|Miami, Oklahoma, United States
|
|-
|Win
|align=center|9–1
|Brent Weedman
|Decision (unanimous)
|Bellator 49
|
|align=center|3
|align=center|5:00
|Atlantic City, New Jersey, United States
|
|-
|Win
|align=center|8–1
|Derek Smith
|Submission (rear-naked choke)
|NAAFS: Fight Night in the Flats 7
|
|align=center|1
|align=center|2:20
|Cleveland, Ohio, United States
|
|-
|Win
|align=center|7–1
|Gerric Hayes
|KO (punch and head kick)
|NAAFS: Caged Vengeance 9
|
|align=center|1
|align=center|4:59
|Canton, Ohio, United States
|
|-
|Loss
|align=center|6–1
|Lyman Good
|Decision (unanimous)
|Bellator 35
|
|align=center|3
|align=center|5:00
|Lemoore, California, United States
|
|-
|Win
|align=center|6–0
|Yoshiyuki Yoshida
|TKO (corner stoppage)
|Bellator 31
|
|align=center|2
|align=center|5:00
|Lake Charles, Louisiana, United States
|
|-
|Win
|align=center|5–0
|Jason Dent
|TKO (retirement)
|NAAFS: Fight Night in the Flats 6 
|
|align=center|4
|align=center|5:00
|Cleveland, Ohio, United States
|Welterweight debut.
|-
|Win
|align=center|4–0
|Brandon Gaines
|KO (punch)
|Freestyle Cage Fighting 40
|
|align=center|1
|align=center|3:56
|Shawnee, Oklahoma, United States
|
|-
|Win
|align=center|3–0
|Allan Weickert
|KO (punch)
|NAAFS: Night of Champions
|
|align=center|1
|align=center|4:55
|Akron, Ohio, United States
|
|-
|Win
|align=center|2–0
|John Fields
|KO (punch)
|NAAFS: Rock N Rumble 3 
|
|align=center|1
|align=center|0:47
|Cleveland, Ohio, United States
|
|-
|Win
|align=center|1–0
|Marcus Kuck
|KO (punches)
|NAAFS: Fight Night in the Flats 5 
|
|align=center|1
|align=center|0:37
|Cleveland, Ohio, United States
|
|-

References

American male mixed martial artists
Mixed martial artists from Ohio
Welterweight mixed martial artists
Mixed martial artists utilizing taekwondo
Mixed martial artists utilizing collegiate wrestling
Mixed martial artists utilizing boxing
Mixed martial artists utilizing Brazilian jiu-jitsu
Boxers from Ohio
American male taekwondo practitioners
American practitioners of Brazilian jiu-jitsu
Living people
1982 births
Sportspeople from Cleveland
American male boxers
American male sport wrestlers